Maxwell Francis Briggs (born 9 September 1948) is a former professional footballer.

References

1948 births
English footballers
Living people
Norwich City F.C. players
Oxford United F.C. players
Association football midfielders
Place of birth missing (living people)
20th-century English people